Mary Lou, Mary-Lou, Marylou or Marilou may refer to:

People
 Marilou (singer) (Marilou Bourdon, born 1990), French-Canadian pop singer and cookbook author
 Marilou Awiakta (born 1936), American poet
 Mary Lou Belli, American television director and author
 Marilou Berry (born 1983), French actress, film director and screenwriter
 Mary Lou Beschorner (1929–2008), American player in the All-American Girls Professional Baseball League
 Mary Lou Clements-Mann (1946–1998), American biologist
 Mary Lou Crocker (1944–2016), American golfer
 Mary-Lou Daniels (born 1961), American retired tennis player
 Marylou Dawes (1933–2013), Canadian concert pianist
 Marilou Diaz-Abaya (1955–2012), Filipino film director
 Mary Lou Dickerson (born 1946), American politician
 Marilou Dozois-Prévost (born 1986), Canadian weightlifter	
 Mary Lou Fallis (born 1948), Canadian opera singer
 Mary Lou Farrell (1942–2011), Canadian singer, actress and beauty queen
 Mary Lou Finlay (born 1947), Canadian radio and television journalist
 Mary Lou Forbes (1926–2009), American Pulitzer Prize-winning journalist and commentator
 Mary Lou Foy (born 1944), American photojournalist
 Mary Lou Freeman (1941–2006), American politician
 Mary Lou Goertzen (1929–2020), American artist, peace activist and Mennonite
 Mary Lou Graham (born 1936), American player in the All-American Girls Professional Baseball League
 Mary Lou Jepsen (born 1965), American entrepreneur, business executive and inventor
 Mary Lou Kolbenschlag (born 1992), American actress - see Mary Lou (actress)
 Mary Lou Lord (born 1965), American indie folk musician and busker
 Mary Lou Makepeace (born 1940, American politician
 Mary Lou McDonald	(born 1969), Irish politician, leader of the Sinn Féin party
 Mary L. McMaster, American oncologist and clinical trialist 
 Mary Lou Metzger (born 1950), American singer and dancer
 Mary Lou Munts (1924–2013), American politician and lawyer
 Mary Lou Petty (1915–2014), American swimmer
 Mary Lou Rath, American politician
 Mary Lou Retton (born 1968), American retired gymnast, 1984 Olympic all-around champion	
 Mary Lou Robinson (1926–2019), American federal judge
 Mary Lou Soffa, American computer scientist
 Mary Lou Studnicka (1931–2014), American pitcher in the All-American Girls Professional Baseball League
 Mary Lou Turner (born 1947), American country music singer
 Mary Louise Marylou Whitney (1925–2019), American philanthropist and socialite
 Mary Lou Williams	(1910–1981), American jazz pianist, arranger and composer
 Mary Lou Zoback (born 1952),  American geophysicist

Fictional characters
 Mary Lou Collins, in The Larry Sanders Show
Marylou, a character in the novel On the Road by American writer Jack Kerouac
Marylou Ahearn, a character in the novel The Revenge of the Radioactive Lady by Elizabeth Stuckey-French
Marylou, a character in the movie The Howling (film) played by Elizabeth Shé

See also
 Marilu

Feminine given names
Compound given names